Anke Huber (born 4 December 1974) is a German retired top-five professional tennis player. She was the runner-up in women's singles at the 1996 Australian Open and the 1995 WTA Finals. Huber won twelve singles and one doubles title on the WTA Tour. She finished inside the top twenty for ten seasons, and achieved a career-high ranking of four in October 1996.

Early life

Huber was born in Bruchsal, Baden-Württemberg.  She started playing tennis at the age of seven, after being introduced to the game by her father, Edgar. In junior competition, she won the under-12 German Championships in 1986, the under-14s in 1987, the under-16s in 1988, and the European Championships in 1989. She was also a semifinalist at Wimbledon's junior tournament in 1990.

Career

Huber made her Grand Slam tournament debut at the 1990 Australian Open, a year before she graduated from high school. After defeating Maider Laval and Elise Burgin, she was defeated in the third round by 13th-seeded Raffaella Reggi. In August 1990, she defeated Marianne Werdel Witmeyer to win the Schenectady tournament, a warm-up for the US Open. Jennifer Capriati then defeated Huber in the first round of that tournament 7–5, 7–5.  Huber was the runner-up in her next event, losing in Bayonne to Nathalie Tauziat in straight sets.  She finished 1990 ranked World No. 34.

Huber became Germany's top female tennis player upon Steffi Graf's retirement in 1999. Only two years later, however, it was Huber's turn to hang up her racquet.  She cited a persistent ankle injury and the desire for a "normal life" as the reasons for her retirement.  She originally planned to quit after the 2002 Australian Open, her favorite tournament, but changed her mind when she unexpectedly qualified for the year-ending Sanex Championships in Germany. "I thought there's nothing better than to celebrate saying goodbye in front of the home fans in your own country", said Huber.  Huber's final match took place on 31 October 2001, against Justine Henin, which she lost 6–1, 6–2.

During her twelve-year professional career, Huber reached 23 singles finals (winning twelve of them), 29 singles semifinals, and 50 singles quarterfinals. Her career record in singles was 447–225, and she amassed US$4,768,292 in career prize money.

Huber represented her country at three levels: the Olympic Games in 1992 in Barcelona and in 1996 in Atlanta; the Fed Cup from 1990 through 1998 and in 2000 and 2001, helping Germany to victory in 1992 by beating Spain's Conchita Martínez in the final; and the Hopman Cup, which she won with Boris Becker in 1995.

Although she did not win a Grand Slam title, Huber felt proud of her accomplishments, especially because she had to walk in Graf's footsteps. "I recognised pretty early on that I would never have her success, but I was still always measured against her", she says. "So, whenever I got into the quarterfinals or the semis of a Grand Slam tournament, it counted for nothing. Sometimes it was good to have her, because she drew the attention away from me", Huber continued. "On the other side, there was always the pressure to be the second Steffi Graf."

In 2002, Huber accepted a role with the German Tennis Federation and became the co-tournament director for the annual Porsche Tennis Grand Prix WTA tournament in Filderstadt, Germany.

Personal life
In April 2005, Huber gave birth to her first child, a boy, with her partner Roger Wittmann. A second, a girl, followed in October 2006.

Major finals

Grand Slam finals

Singles: (1 runner–up)

Year-End Championships finals

Singles: (1 runner–up)

WTA Tour finals

Singles: 23 (12–11)

Doubles: 4 (1–3)

ITF finals

Singles (2–0)

Grand Slam singles performance timeline

Head-to-head record against other players in the top 10

Players who have been ranked world No. 1 are in boldface.
Martina Hingis 1–12
Lindsay Davenport 2–10
Dominique Monami 2–1
Arantxa Sánchez Vicario 2–12
Venus Williams 1–3
Steffi Graf 0–10
Kim Clijsters 1–2
Justine Henin 0–3
Amélie Mauresmo 2–3
Nadia Petrova 1–0
Monica Seles 0–9
Martina Navratilova 2–1
Conchita Martínez 6–2
Jennifer Capriati 1–7
Amanda Coetzer 4–3
Anna Kournikova 3–3
Mary Joe Fernández 3–4
Kimiko Date 1–2
Nathalie Tauziat 4–8
Jana Novotná 4–8
Irina Spîrlea 7–1
Gabriela Sabatini 3–4
Mary Pierce 5–6
Helena Suková 2–0
Manuela Maleeva-Fragniere 2–0

See also
 Performance timelines for all female tennis players who reached at least one Grand Slam final

References

External links
 
 
 

1974 births
Living people
People from Bruchsal
Sportspeople from Karlsruhe (region)
German female tennis players
Tennis players at the 1992 Summer Olympics
Tennis players at the 1996 Summer Olympics
Tennis players at the 2000 Summer Olympics
Olympic tennis players of Germany
Hopman Cup competitors
West German female tennis players
Tennis people from Baden-Württemberg